Cairo holds one of the greatest concentrations of historical monuments of Islamic architecture in the world, and includes mosques and Islamic religious complexes from diverse historical periods. Many buildings were primarily designated as madrasas, khanqahs or even mausoleums rather than mosques, but have nonetheless served as places of worship or prayer at some time or another, if not today.

Rashidunids

Abbasids

Fatimids

Mamluks

Ottomans and Alawiyya Dynasty

Modern

See also
 List of buildings in Cairo
 List of mosques in Egypt
 List of Coptic Orthodox churches in Egypt#Diocese of Coptic Cairo
 List of Coptic Orthodox churches in Egypt#Dioceses of Cairo and Giza

References
Cited:

General:

Behrens-Absouseif, Doris (1989). Islamic Architecture in Cairo: An Introduction. Leiden, the Netherlands: E.J. Brill.
 O'Kane, Bernard (2016). The Mosques of Egypt. Cairo: The American University in Cairo Press.
 Williams, Caroline (2018). Islamic Monuments in Cairo: The Practical Guide (7th ed.). Cairo: The American University in Cairo Press.

 
Cairo
+
Mosques
Mosques